The United States Department of Defense acknowledges holding eight Jordanian captives in Guantanamo.
A total of 778 captives have been held in extrajudicial detention in the Guantanamo Bay detention camps, in Cuba since the camps opened on January 11, 2002
The camp population peaked in 2004 at approximately 660.  Only nineteen new captives, all "high value detainees" have been transferred there since the United States Supreme Court's ruling in Rasul v. Bush.  As of July 2012 the camp population was at approximately 170. This number had dropped to 40 by May 2018.

References

Lists of Guantanamo Bay detainees by nationality

Jordan–United States relations